Baeonoma suavis is a moth of the family Depressariidae. It is found in French Guiana.

The wingspan is about 15 mm. The forewings are light yellow-ochreous, yellower towards the costa, tinged with violet-brownish towards the dorsum, with a few scattered fuscous specks, the costal edge whitish. There is a fuscous transverse mark on the end of the cell. The hindwings are dark grey.

References

Moths described in 1916
Baeonoma
Moths of South America
Taxa named by Edward Meyrick